At least three steamships have been named Reiher;

 , a German cargo ship in service 1871–1907.
 , a German cargo ship in service 1909–1938.
 , a German cargo ship in service 1938–1939.

References

Ship names